Gamma Pegasi is a star in the constellation of Pegasus, located at the southeast corner of the asterism known as the Great Square. It has the formal name Algenib ; the Bayer designation Gamma Pegasi is Latinized from γ Pegasi and abbreviated Gamma Peg or γ Peg. The average apparent visual magnitude of +2.84 makes this the fourth-brightest star in the constellation.

Nomenclature
Gamma Pegasi is the star's Bayer designation. Although it also had the traditional name Algenib, this name was also used for Alpha Persei. In 2016, the International Astronomical Union organized a Working Group on Star Names (WGSN) to catalog and standardize proper names for stars. The WGSN's first bulletin of July 2016 included a table of the first two batches of names approved by the WGSN; which included Algenib for this star (Alpha Persei was given the name Mirfak).

The asterism of γ Pegasi and α Andromedae, in Hindu astronomy, is called Uttara Bhādrapadā (उत्तरभाद्रपदा) or Uttṛṭṭāti. It is the 26th nakshatra.

Properties

In 1911, American astronomer Keivin Burns discovered that the radial velocity of Gamma Pegasi varied slightly. This was confirmed in 1953 by American astronomer D. Harold McNamara, who identified it as a Beta Cephei variable. (At the time he actually identified it as a Beta Canis Majoris star, which was subsequently designated a Beta Cephei variable.) It has a radial pulsation period of 0.15175 days (3.642 hours), but also shows the behavior of a slowly pulsating B star (SPB) with three additional pulsational frequencies. Its magnitude varies between +2.78 and +2.89 over the course of each pulsation cycle.

This is a large star with almost nine times the mass of the Sun and close to five times the Sun's radius. The stellar classification of B2 IV suggests this is a subgiant star that is exhausting the hydrogen at its core and is in the process of evolving away from the main sequence. It is either rotating very slowly with no measurable rotational velocity or else it is being viewed from nearly pole-on. Gamma Pegasi has a total luminosity of 5,840 times that of the Sun, which is being radiated from its outer atmosphere at an effective temperature of more than 21,000 K. At this temperature, the star glows with a blue-white hue.

The star has a weak magnetic field (from -10 G to 30 G, an upper bound on a dipolar magnetic field strength of about ).

References

External links

B-type subgiants
Beta Cephei variables

Pegasus (constellation)
Pegasi, Gamma
0039
Durchmusterung objects
Pegasi, 88
000886
001067
Algenib